Pellaea truncata is a species of fern known by the common name spiny cliffbrake. It is native to the southwestern United States and northern Mexico, where it grows in rocky areas, such as cliffs and slopes.

Description
Pellaea truncata has leaves up to 40 centimeters long. The fertile leaves are longer and more subdivided than the smaller, simpler sterile leaves. The leaf is composed of several leaflets which are each divided into several linear to oblong or pointed oval segments. The segments may have wavy edges, and the fertile ones have their edges rolled under. The sporangia are located under the edges.

References

External links
Jepson Manual Treatment - Pellaea truncata
USDA Plants Profile; Pellaea truncata
Flora of North America
Pellaea truncata - Photo gallery

truncata
Ferns of California
Ferns of the United States
Flora of Northwestern Mexico
Flora of the Southwestern United States
Flora of Arizona
Flora of New Mexico